Niccolò I Trinci (died 10 January 1421) was the lord of Foligno from 1412. He inherited it from his father Ugolino III Trinci. He fought also as condottiero for the Republic of Venice. In 1404, he married Tora da Varano, daughter of Rodolfo III da Varano, lord of Camerino.

In 1421, the Castellan of Nocera Umbra, Pietro di Rasiglia, since suspected his wife of adultery with Niccolò, invited the whole Trinci family to a hunting party and killed all of them, except the young Corrado, who took revenge for the murder of his relatives, attacking the town and killing the castellan.

References

Trinci, Niccolo 1
Trinci, Niccolo 1
Trinci, Niccolo 1
Niccolo 1
Trinci, Niccolo 1
Lords of Foligno